Washita County is a county located in the U.S. state of Oklahoma. As of the 2010 census, the population was 11,629. Its county seat is New Cordell. The county seat was formerly located in Cloud Chief. The county was created in 1891.

History
In 1883, John Miles leased  of Cheyenne and Arapaho land to seven cattlemen. However, arguments soon developed between the cattlemen and the tribesmen. In 1885, the Federal government terminated all of the leases and ordered the cattlemen to remove their stock.

The area was settled in 1886, when John Seger established a colony along Cobb Creek. Seger convinced 120 Cheyenne and Arapaho to settle near the old ranch headquarters at Cobb Creek. The intent was that "Seger's Colony" would teach these tribes how to farm, using modern agricultural methods.  The name, Seger's Colony, would be shortened and become the present day town of Colony, Oklahoma.

After the government declared the excess lands of the Cheyenne and Arapaho Indian Reservation available for non-Indian settlement, the Cheyenne-Arapaho Opening was made available to homesteading on April 19, 1892, in the Land Run of 1892.  At that time, the town of Tacola, soon renamed to Cloud Chief, was designated by the Secretary of the Interior as the county seat.

Washita County is located in that part of western Oklahoma which was included in County H of the Territory of Oklahoma, an organized incorporated territory of the United States that existed from 2 May 1890, until 16 November 1907, when it was joined with the Indian territory and admitted to the Union as the State of Oklahoma.  The county itself was renamed for the Washita River.  The French had called the river "Faux Ouachita", literally meaning "false Washita", to distinguish it from the ‘true’ Ouachita in Arkansas and Louisiana.  The spelling of the name of the Oklahoma Washita was changed by substituting "w" for "ou".

An election in 1900 designated the town of Cordell as the county seat. It was favored by the majority because it was located in the center of the county. The election result was contested in court. The Oklahoma Territorial Supreme Court ruled in 1904 that the seat could not be moved without Federal authorization. The U. S. Congress moved the seat to Cordell in 1906. When the Oklahoma Constitution went into effect at statehood in 1907, it confirmed Cordell (by then relocated and renamed New Cordell) as the county seat.

In 1948, the nation's first flood control dam under the authorization of the Flood Control Act of 1944 was completed in the Cloud Creek Watershed in Washita County.

The lyrics for 1968 hit song Wichita Lineman were inspired by Jimmy Webb's driving through Washita County westward on a straight road into the setting sun past a seemingly endless line of telephone poles, each looking exactly the same as the last. In the distance he noticed the silhouette of a solitary lineman atop a pole, which he described as "the picture of loneliness".

Geography

The county lies in the Western Redbeds Plains sub-region of the Osage Plains. The Washita River drains most of the county, except that the southwest corner drains into the North Fork of the Red River

Adjacent counties
 Custer County - north
 Caddo County - east
 Kiowa County - south
 Beckham County - west

Demographics

As of the 2010 United States Census, there were 11,629 people, 4,599 households, and 3,186 families residing in the county.  The population density was 11.5 people per square mile (4.4/km2).  There were 5,479 housing units at an average density of 5.4 per square mile (2.1/km2).  The racial makeup of the county was 95.8% white, 0.7% black or African American, 3% Native American, 0.2% Asian, less than 0.1% Pacific Islander, 3.6% from other races, and 4.2% from two or more races.  Eight percent of the population were Hispanic or Latino of any race.  Ninety-six percent spoke only English and 3.3% spoke Spanish.

There were 4,599 households, out of which 33.1% had children under the age of 18 living with them, 54.8% were married couples living together, 9.5% had a female householder with no husband present, 5% had a male household with no wife present, and 30.7% were non-families.  Individuals living alone accounted for 27.1% of households, and individuals 65 years of age or older living alone accounted for 13% of households.  The average household size was 2.48 and the average family size was 2.98.

In the county, the population was spread out, with 25.8% under the age of 18, 7.4% from 18 to 24, 23.4% from 25 to 44, 26.3% from 45 to 64, and 17.1% who were 65 years of age or older.  The median age was 39 years. For every 100 females there were 93.90 males.  For every 100 females age 18 and over, there were 89.20 males.

The median income for a household in the county was $44,331, and the median income for a family was $56,619.  Males had a median income of $42,149 versus $31,402 for females.  The per capita income for the county was $22,781.  About 12% of families and 16% of the population were below the poverty line, including 25% of those under age 18 and 10.7% of those age 65 or over.

Politics

Prior to 1952, Washita County was dominated by the Democratic Party as part of the Solid South. However, it backed the national winner in every presidential election from 1928 to 1992 except for 1956 and 1960. It last voted for a Democratic presidential candidate in 1992.

Communities

Cities
 Clinton (part)
 New Cordell (county seat)

Towns

 Bessie
 Burns Flat
 Canute
 Colony
 Corn
 Dill City
 Foss
 Rocky
 Sentinel

Unincorporated communities
 Cloud Chief
 Port

See also
 National Register of Historic Places listings in Washita County, Oklahoma

References

 
1891 establishments in Oklahoma Territory
Populated places established in 1891